The name Tri-Cities refers to two regions in the U.S. state of Michigan. Both are located in the Lower Peninsula.

The Greater Tri-Cities Region

The larger and more well known Tri-Cities is the region surrounding the cities of Saginaw, Bay City, and Midland.  This region, which is also considered to be part of the Central Michigan, includes much of Bay County,  Saginaw County, and Midland County. These three counties make up the Greater Tri Cities, a common term describing this region of Michigan. As of recently, the region also goes by the name of the Great Lakes Bay Region.

Statistically, the region is known as the Saginaw, Midland, and Bay City Metropolitan Area, a combined statistical area composed of Saginaw, Midland, and Bay counties. The combined population of these three counties was 377,474 as of the 2020 census.

Grand Haven/Ferrysburg/Spring Lake
The smaller, less known Tri-Cities region lies in Western Michigan's Ottawa County. The three towns are Grand Haven, Ferrysburg, and Spring Lake. The combined population of these three places and adjacent townships is 47,263 as of the 2020 Census. This tri-city region is located west of Grand Rapids.

Notes

See also

Greater Tri Cities Region
Flint/Tri-Cities
The Thumb

Grand Haven/Ferrysburg/Spring Lake
Western Michigan

External links
 List of Museums, other attractions compiled by state government.
 Michigan's Official Economic Development and Travel Site.

Regions of Michigan
Geography of Michigan